The 2019 Belgian Indoor Athletics Championships was the year's national championship in indoor track and field for Belgium. It was held on Sunday 17 February at the Flanders Sports Arena in Ghent. A total of 25 events, 13 for men and 12 for women, were contested. It served as preparation for the 2019 European Athletics Indoor Championships.

Results

Men

Women

References

Results
 Results  

Belgian Indoor Athletics Championships
Belgian Indoor Athletics Championships
Belgian Indoor Athletics Championships
Belgian Indoor Athletics Championships
Sports competitions in Ghent